Birchfield Harriers is an athletics club, founded in 1877. Its home is at Birmingham's Alexander Stadium, England.

As well as welcoming recreational runners they cater for all levels of experience up to and including Olympic athletes whether able-bodied or wheelchair-using athletes.

The Club's motto is Fleet and Free.

History 

The Harriers were named after the Birchfield district of Birmingham. Their previous home (from 1929-77), at nearby Perry Barr, was Alexander Sports Ground. It still carries their badge, a running stag, rendered in this case in Art Deco style, carved in 1929 and attributed to William Bloye. Both venues were named for members of the Alexander family, who were prominent members of the club.

Tom McCook, a former athlete and club chairman, was the club's President from 2001 until standing down at the end of 2013.

Honours
800m and relay runner Pat Cropper was made a Member of the Order of the British Empire (MBE) for her running achievements.
In the 2000 New Year Honours, heptathlete Denise Lewis was made an Officer of the Order of the British Empire (OBE).
Coach Norma Blaine was made an MBE in the New Years Honours announced on 31 December 2010, for her services to athletics.

Members

 Ainsley Bennett
 Louise Butterworth
 Daniel Caines
 Stewart Faulkner
 Helen Frost
 Ashia Hansen
 Louise Hazel
 Helen Karagounis
 Du'aine Ladejo
 Diane Leather
 Denise Lewis
 Mark Lewis-Francis
 Gladys Lunn
 Doris Nelson Neal OBE
 Joel Fearon
 Katharine Merry
 Peter Radford - subsequently Chairman of UK Athletics and Professor of Sport at Brunel University.
 Mike Rawson
 Scott Rider
 Archie Robertson - Birchfield's first Olympic gold medallist (1908).
 Beryl Randle - world record race walker
William Snook, athlete (1861–1916). After he died in a workhouse hospital, his funeral was paid for by the club.
 Kelly Sotherton
 Ian Stewart
 Bob Weir
 Patrick Makau
 Phil Brown

Bibliography

References

External links
 
 Walter Freeman interview Recorded 1980 with a former Harrier

 
1877 establishments in England